This is a list of bread dishes and foods, which use bread as a primary ingredient. Bread is a staple food prepared from a dough of flour and water, usually by baking. Throughout recorded history it has been popular around the world and is one of the oldest artificial foods, having been of importance since the dawn of agriculture.

Bread dishes

 
 
 
 
 
 
 Bread bowl

Bread salads

 Cappon magro
 Dakos
 Fattoush
 Panzanella

Bread soups

Bread soup is a simple soup that mainly consists of stale bread in a meat or vegetable broth.

Jeon
Jeon refers to many pancake-like dishes in Korean cuisine.

Pancakes

Paratha
Paratha is a flatbread that originated in the north of the Indian subcontinent.

Sandwiches

Tableware

 Trencher – type of tableware, commonly used in medieval cuisine; originally a flat round of bread used as a plate, upon which the food could be placed before being eaten

Toast

Tortilla dishes

See also

 Bread crumbs
 List of breads
 List of bread rolls
 List of buns
 Lists of prepared foods
 List of quick breads
 Rusk

References

 
Bread dishes
Lists of foods by ingredient